The 1995 All-Big East Conference football team consists of American football players chosen by various selectors for their All-Big East Conference ("Big East") teams for the 1995 NCAA Division I-A football season. Selectors in 1995 included the Football News (FN). 

Six teams placed more than two players on the first team as follows:
 Despite finishing in last place in the conference, Pittsburgh (0–7 record in conference play) led the conference with four players on the All-Big East first team. The Pitt honorees were: wide receiver Dietrich Jells, linebacker Tom Tumulty, placekicker Chris Ferencik, and punter Nate Cochran.
 Conference champion Virginia Tech was ranked No. 10 in the final AP Poll and placed three players on the first team: offensive lineman Bill Conaty and defensive linemen Cornell Brown and J. C. Price.
 Syracuse was ranked No. 19 in the final AP Poll and also placed three players on the first team: quarterback Donovan McNabb, wide receiver Marvin Harrison, and defensive back Kevin Abrams.
 Miami was ranked No. 20 in the final AP Poll and placed three players on the first team: running back Danyell Ferguson, defensive lineman Kenny Holmes, and linebacker Ray Lewis.
 Fourth-place West Virginia also placed three on the first team: linebacker Canute Curtis and defensive backs Torrian Gray and William Yarborough.
 Sixth-place Rugers also placed three on the first team: running back Terrell Willis, tight end Marco Battaglia, and offensive lineman Pat Cormann.

Offensive selections

Quarterbacks
 Donovan McNabb, Syracuse (FN)

Running backs
 Danyell Ferguson, Miami (FN)
 Terrell Willis, Rutgers (FN)

Wide receivers
 Marvin Harrison, Syracuse (FN)
 Dietrich Jells, Pittsburgh (FN)

Tight ends
 Marco Battaglia, Rutgers (FN)

Offensive linemen
 Pat Corman, Rutgers (FN)
 Bill Conaty, Virginia Tech (FN)
 John Summerday, Temple (FN)
 Pete Kendall, Boston College (FN)

Defensive selections

Defensive linemen
 Cornell Brown, Virginia Tech (FN)
 J. C. Price, Virginia Tech (FN)
 Kenny Holmes, Miami (FN)

Linebackers
 Ray Lewis, Miami (FN)
 Lance Johnstone, Temple (FN)
 Tom Tumulty, Pittsburgh (FN)
 Canute Curtis, West Virginia (FN)

Defensive backs
 Kevin Abrams, Syracuse (FN)
 Torrian Gray, Virginia Tech (FN)
 William Yarborough, West Virginia (FN)

Special teams

Placekickers
 Chris Ferencik, Pittsburgh (FN)

Punters
 Nate Cochran, Pittsburgh (FN)

Key
FN = Football News

References

All-Big East Conference football team
All-Big East Conference football teams